Stephanomeria occultata is a species of rhizomes flowering plant in the family Asteraceae. It is endemic to northern Utah.

Origin of its name 
Stephanomeria occultata was discovered in a parking lot for launching rafts into the river in 2018. Occultata means hidden in Latin. It showed in a Google street view image in 2015, 3 years before its discovery before someone came along and decided to key it. When they realized that it didn't match any species listed, they suspected a new species and that is how Stephanomeria occultata was discovered.

Germination of seeds 
Its seeds prefer to grow in clay soils with a layer of soil above them. Seedlings are easy to grow and are attractive to animals. Partial shade is best for growing its seedlings. They are slow growing and the stem seedlings have a purple-pinkish color. Leaves are green and some have tiny triangle shaped protruding from the leaves. Seeds are like dandelion seeds with a parachute on top and a seed on the bottom. The entire seed including the top goes into the substrate for planting. Then, cover the substrate with a sprinkle of your topsoil ensuring cover of the seeds. Water 3 times a week until seed germination occurs and reduce watering to around 2 a week. They are slow growers and the first flowering will occur in around 2 years.

References

occultata